Leptospermum sphaerocarpum is a species of shrub that is endemic to New South Wales. It has thin, firm bark, elliptical, sharply-pointed leaves, greenish white or pink flowers and fruit that remain on the plant at maturity.

Description
There are many reddish brown bracts at the base of the flower bud but which fall off long before the flower opens.

Taxonomy and naming
Leptospermum sphaerocarpum was first formally described in 1932 by Edwin Cheel in the Journal and Proceedings of the Royal Society of New South Wales, from specimens he collected near Rylstone.

Distribution and habitat
This tea-tree in grows in heath and forest on sandstone ridges and cliffs In the Warrumbungles and south to the Blue Mountains and upper Hunter River in New South Wales.

References

sphaerocarpum
Flora of New South Wales
Myrtales of Australia
Plants described in 1932
Taxa named by Edwin Cheel